Ups and Downs is a 1915 American silent comedy film featuring Oliver Hardy.

Cast
 Bobby Burns as Pokes
 Walter Stull as Jabbs
 Oliver Hardy as Shifty Mike (as Babe Hardy)
 Ethel Marie Burton as Ethel
 Frank Hanson as Runt

See also
 List of American films of 1915
 Oliver Hardy filmography

External links

1915 films
American silent short films
American black-and-white films
1915 comedy films
1915 short films
Silent American comedy films
American comedy short films
1910s American films